Pseudicius maculatus is a jumping spider that lives in Lesotho and South Africa. The species name derives from the Latin for spotted or speckled, as it has a patterned abdomen.

References

Salticidae
Spiders described in 2011
Spiders of Africa
Spiders of South Africa
Fauna of Lesotho